"Sei bellissima" is an Italian song written by Claudio Daiano and Gian Pietro Felisatti and performed by Loredana Bertè. During the years Bertè claimed to be the actual composer of the song, but that at the time she was unable to sign it as she was not a member of SIAE. According to Bertè, lyrics were inspired by her relationship with Adriano Panatta.

The musical arrangement by Vince Tempera was inspired by Riccardo Cocciante's "Bella senz'anima".

The song premiered at the 1975 Un disco per l'estate, being eliminated from the competition; nevertheless, the single was a commercial success, peaking at the thirteenth place on the Italian singles chart. The song was the first hit for Bertè, following the commercial failure of her debut album Striking. 
 
The verse "a letto mi diceva sempre non vali che un po' più di niente" (i.e. "in bed he used to say 'you are not worth a bit more than anything'") was initially censored and replaced by "e poi mi diceva sempre non vali che un po' più di niente" ("and then he used to say 'you are not worth a bit more than anything'"). A version with the original lyrics was eventually released the same year.

Track listing
7" single – CGD 3247 
A "Sei bellissima" (Claudio Daiano, Gian Pietro Felisatti) – 4:50
B "Spiagge di notte" (Daniele Pace) – 3:00

Charts

References

1975 songs
1975 singles
Loredana Bertè songs
Compagnia Generale del Disco singles
Songs written by Gian Pietro Felisatti